The Broadley's ridged frog (Ptychadena broadleyi) is a species of frog in the family Ptychadenidae. It is endemic to Malawi.

Its natural habitats are subtropical or tropical moist montane forest, moist savanna, and rocky areas. It is threatened by habitat loss.

References

broadleyi
Amphibians of Malawi
Endemic fauna of Malawi
Amphibians described in 1972
Taxonomy articles created by Polbot